Jordan Gruber (born September 12, 1983) is an American-Israeli professional football (soccer) player. Playing soccer for Birmingham Groves High School, he set the Michigan State High School goal-scoring record, and was named Oakland Press Player of the Year. After playing for Michigan State University, professionally he was a member of OFK Beograd, Maccabi HaShikma Ramat Hen, and Hapoel Marmorek. He played for Team USA at the 2005 Maccabiah Games in Israel, winning a silver medal.

Biography
He is the son of Avi, originally from Israel, and the owner of Avi's Auto Care, and Abby Gruber, and was born in Beverly Hills, Michigan. He attended Birmingham Groves High School, for whom he played soccer.  He set the Michigan State High School goal-scoring record with 69 goals as a senior, in addition to 21 assists. He was named Oakland Press Player of the Year, and was named all-district, all-region, all-state, all-metro, and all-county. He also lettered in tennis as a senior.

He played college soccer at forward for the Michigan State University for the Michigan State Spartans. In September 2004 he was named the Big Ten Offensive Player of the Week in men's soccer.

In June 2005, he signed a six-month contract with OFK Beograd straight out of university. He made aliyah in 2007 via the Law of Return, and played for Israel's Maccabi HaShikma Ramat Hen and Hapoel Marmorek.

He played for the United States team at the 2005 Maccabiah Games in Israel, winning a silver medal.

Statistics

References

1983 births
Living people
Competitors at the 2005 Maccabiah Games
Jewish footballers
Jewish American sportspeople
Maccabiah Games medalists in football
Maccabiah Games silver medalists for the United States
American emigrants to Israel
Israeli footballers
Maccabi HaShikma Ramat Hen F.C. players
Hapoel Marmorek F.C. players
American expatriate soccer players
Soccer players from Michigan
Sportspeople from Oakland County, Michigan
OFK Beograd players
Expatriate footballers in Serbia
Michigan State Spartans men's soccer players
Flint City Bucks players
USL League Two players
American soccer players
People from Beverly Hills, Michigan
Association football forwards
21st-century American Jews